You might be looking for:
 Mankiala, a village in Rawalpindi District, Pakistan
 Mankiala Stupa, a Buddhist stupa found near the village
 Mankiyali, a minority language of northern Pakistan
 Mankhiyai, a village in Madhya Pradesh, India